The Poet Laureate of Hawaii or Ka Haku-Mele O Hawaii is the poet laureate for the U.S. state of Hawaii. Prior to statehood Don Blanding, originally from Oklahoma, was unofficially referred to as the poet laureate of Hawaii. In 1951 Hawaii Territorial Senator Thelma Akana Harrison in concurrent resolution 28, declared Lloyd Stone, who was originally from California, poet laureate. When the modern program was established, Native Hawaiian Kealoha was appointed on May 3, 2012, and he is the first poet laureate for the state of Hawaii, serving through 2022.

See also

 Poet laureate
 List of U.S. states' poets laureate
 United States Poet Laureate

References

 
Hawaii culture
American Poets Laureate